South Dakota Highway 47 (SD 47) is a state route that runs north to south across the central portion of South Dakota. It begins at an unnumbered highway at the North Dakota border north of Eureka, and ends at the Nebraska border, where it becomes Nebraska Highway 137. It is just under  in length.

History 

When initially established in the mid-1920s, South Dakota 47 extended from U.S. Highway 16 at Pukwana to U.S. Highway 18 at Wheeler, along what is currently portions of South Dakota Highway 50 and Charles Mix County Highway 49. Around 1932, the south end of SD 47 was truncated at Platte, then a few years later in 1936, SD 47 was extended west to Chamberlain, before heading north to the intersection of U.S. Highway 14 at Highmore.

The segment between Pukwana and Platte was redesignated as part of South Dakota Highway 43 , and SD 47 was rerouted west from Chamberlain to Oacoma, then extended southward to U. S. 18 at Gregory. 11 years later, SD 47 was extended south to the Nebraska border, via a shared alignment with U. S. 18 to Burke.

In 1955, near Oacoma, SD 47 was rerouted west to near Reliance, before heading south to meet with the old alignment near the White River. Also in 1955, SD 47 was extended north to Eureka via Lebanon and Bowdle. Ten years later, in 1965, the highway would be extended further north to the North Dakota border.

In 1976, the segment between Ft. Thompson and Reliance, which had previously passed through Chamberlain and Oacoma, was rerouted onto the more direct road formerly known as South Dakota Highway 47W, which had been constructed around 1965. The previous segment between Ft. Thompson and Chamberlain was designated as an extension of South Dakota Highway 50.

Major intersections

Related route

South Dakota Highway 47W was a state route located in central South Dakota. SD 47W designated around 1965, on a newly constructed road linking Fort Thompson and Reliance.  This designation was used only for 10 years; it was made part of South Dakota Highway 47 when a portion of that route was realigned.

References

External links

 South Dakota Highways Page: Highways 31-60

047
Transportation in Gregory County, South Dakota
Transportation in Lyman County, South Dakota
Transportation in Buffalo County, South Dakota
Transportation in Hyde County, South Dakota
Transportation in Faulk County, South Dakota
Transportation in Potter County, South Dakota
Transportation in Walworth County, South Dakota
Transportation in Edmunds County, South Dakota
Transportation in McPherson County, South Dakota